Members of the U.S. Securities and Exchange Commission are appointed by the President of the United States. Their terms last five years and are staggered so that one commissioner's term ends on June 5 of each year. If an appointment is to fill out an uncompleted term, it will be for less than five years. To ensure that the commission remains non-partisan, no more than three commissioners may belong to the same political party. The President also designates one of the commissioners as chairman, the SEC's top executive. Service may continue past term expiration up to eighteen additional months. This page is sorted by president and date of appointment; a second list sorts the page by SEC member's employment with private firms.

List of members

References

External links

Appointees